Tamaya, also known as Santa Ana Pueblo,  north of Bernalillo, New Mexico, dates from 1694. It was listed on the National Register of Historic Places in 1974.

It was rebuilt in 1734 by Fray Diego Arias de Espinoza. It is included in the modern Santa Ana Pueblo CDP.

References

Pueblos
National Register of Historic Places in Sandoval County, New Mexico
Buildings and structures completed in 1694